Chaungzon is a village in Homalin Township, Hkamti District, in the Sagaing Region of northwestern Burma. It is located north of Kaukngo.

References

External links
Maplandia World Gazetteer

Populated places in Hkamti District
Homalin Township